David Trapp (born August 5, 1981) is a Belizean professional midfielder currently playing for Belmopan Bandits.

Notes

1981 births
Living people
Belize international footballers
Belizean footballers
Premier League of Belize players
2007 UNCAF Nations Cup players
2013 CONCACAF Gold Cup players
Association football midfielders
Belmopan Bandits players
Belize Defence Force FC players